Soppitt is a surname. Notable people with the surname include:

Henry Thomas Soppitt (1858–1899), English scientist 
William Soppitt (1856–1910), English cricketer